The Martyr Nubar Ozanyan Brigade is an Armenian military organization in Syria and a part of the Syrian Democratic Forces. The brigade was founded in the Marziya Church in the Assyrian village of Tell Goran on 24 April 2019, the 104th anniversary of the Armenian genocide.

The brigade is named after Nubar Ozanyan, a Turkish-born Armenian Marxist-Leninist revolutionary, who was commander of TİKKO, the armed wing of the Communist Party of Turkey/Marxist-Leninist (TKP-ML), in Syria during the 2017 battle of Raqqa, in which he was killed in action.

The brigade stated that its goals are to defend the Armenians of Syria, the language, and culture, and all peoples of the Autonomous Administration of North and East Syria from the Islamic State of Iraq and the Levant (ISIL) and the Turkish state, which it described as the "current representatives of the fascist Union and Progress Committee".

On 14 August 2019 the Martyr Nubar Ozanyan Brigade and the TKP-ML held a joint ceremony commemorating the second anniversary of Ozanyan's death during the battle of Raqqa, attended by representatives from multiple SDF militias and other Turkish communist groups of the International Freedom Battalion.

See also 
 Christian militias in Iraq and Syria
 Armenians in Syria
 Armenian Secret Army for the Liberation of Armenia

References

2019 establishments in Syria
Anti-ISIL factions in Syria
Apoist organizations in Syria
Armenian militant groups
Left-wing militant groups
Syrian Armenian organizations
Syrian Democratic Forces